An aerodrome mapping database is a geographic information system (GIS) database to describe airports. The following standards have been defined by the RTCA and EUROCAE:
 RTCA DO-272A/EUROCAE ED-99A: User requirements for aerodrome mapping information
 RTCA DO-291/EUROCAE ED-119: Interchange standards for terrain, obstacle, and aerodrome mapping data

References

(1) https://web.archive.org/web/20101231112429/http://www.eurocontrol.int/aim/public/standard_page/interop_amxs_intro.html

Geographical databases